The Battle of Kaiyuan was a conflict between the Later Jin and Ming dynasty in the summer of 1619. Following the victory at the Battle of Sarhu, Nurhaci continued the attack on Ming by assaulting the city of Kaiyuan.

The Jin attack occurred during a heavy downpour. Ming dispatched a small relief contingent of 100 men, but they were intercepted by a Jin force and suffered 32 casualties. The Jin army besieged Kaiyuan and attacked Ma Lin's outer defenses, which had been heavily strengthened in preference to a safer position on the walls. However the strategy ended badly for Ma Lin, whose forces were defeated. As too many men were already outside, there were not enough men to man the walls. As imminent defeat became apparent, the Censor Zheng Zhifan fled.

The walls were breached and the fighting continued inside the city for three days before it was pacified. Meanwhile, another relief contingent had been dispatched from Tieling, but was also intercepted by a Jin force and repulsed.

Ma Lin was captured and executed.

References

Bibliography

1619 in China
Kaiyuan 1619
Kaiyuan 1619